Plantago lagopus, the hare's foot plantain, is a species of annual herb in the family Plantaginaceae. They have a self-supporting growth form and simple, broad leaves. Flowers are visited by Heliotaurus ruficollis, Malachius, Metopoplax origani, and brown argus. Individuals can grow to 25 cm.

Sources

References 

lagopus
Flora of Malta